Eads is an unincorporated community in Shelby County, Tennessee, United States, named after Civil War engineer James Buchanan Eads. Some parts of Eads (and some surrounding areas) have been annexed by the city of Memphis. Some of its area is currently still unincorporated. Eads is located north of Collierville, west of Somerville, east of Memphis and Bartlett. The Eads zip code (38028) stretches into both Shelby County and Fayette County, including parts of Hickory Withe and Fisherville. Major roads in the community include Winfield Dunn Parkway (Interstate 269), U.S. Route 64, Collierville-Arlington Road/Airline Road (Tennessee State Route 205), and Seward Road.

History 
The community of Eads was founded in 1888, when the Tennessee Midland Railroad tracks of Tennessee were laid out through a village that was known as Sewardville.

Annexation

After a seven-year court challenge to the right of Memphis to annex, small portions of Eads were annexed into the Memphis City Council Second District in the 1990s. Most of Eads is now designated as being in the Memphis reserve, meaning that Memphis can annex it at some point.

Deannexation 
On January 1, 2020, a portion of Eads on the south side of US 64 and just north of the Grays Creek community, between west of Cobb Road and the unincorporated Shelby County boundary line was deannexed from the City of Memphis to return under county jurisdiction.

Education
Most of Eads is serviced by the Shelby County School System. The private Briarcrest Christian School also has a campus in Eads.

Geography
The center of Eads is located at 35°12'09" North, 89°39'02" West.

References 

Neighborhoods in Memphis, Tennessee
Unincorporated communities in Tennessee
Populated places established in 1888
Unincorporated communities in Shelby County, Tennessee
1888 establishments in Tennessee